The 1980 United States Senate election in Washington was held on November 4, 1980. Longtime incumbent Democratic U.S. Senator Warren Magnuson, the Senate President pro tempore, ran for a seventh term in office but lost re-election to State Attorney General Slade Gorton, a Republican. Magnuson was the most senior U.S. senator to lose re-election until Ted Stevens' defeat in 2008. Gorton was one of the dozen Republicans who beat Democrats to seize control of the Senate fueled by Ronald Reagan's landslide victory. , this remains the last time that the Republicans have won Washington's Class 3 Senate seat.

Blanket primary

Candidates

Democratic 
 Warren Magnuson, incumbent U.S. Senator
 James Sherwood Stokes
 John "Hugo Frye" Patric, writer

Republican 
 Slade Gorton, State Attorney General
 Lloyd E. Cooney, former KIRO-TV commentator
 William McCallum

Libertarian 
 Richard K. Kenney

Results

General election

Candidates 
 Warren Magnuson (D), incumbent U.S. Senator
 Slade Gorton (R), State Attorney General

Results

See also 
 1980 United States Senate elections

References 

1980
1980 Washington (state) elections
Washington